Mandimba District is a district of Niassa Province in north-western Mozambique. The principal town is Mandimba.

Further reading
District profile (PDF)

 
Districts in Niassa Province